"Johnny Can't Read" is the first solo single released by Don Henley, included in his debut solo album I Can't Stand Still (1982).  His then partner, former actress Maren Jensen, performs backing vocals. 

It reached #33 in Cash Box magazine and charted at #42 on Billboards Hot 100 chart. The accompanying music video was very popular on MTV.

Meaning 
The song focuses upon reading illiteracy. The song also reflects Henley's respect for reading and his reading background. As he stated in the book Heaven Is Under Our Feet,
"I began to read when I was five.  My dad sometimes read me the 'Funny Papers' on Sundays and my mother, a college graduate and former schoolteacher, read to me almost every day from books. As I grew, she made sure that there was always reading material in the house that was suited to my age and ability."

As for his respect for reading, he stated, "American Literature, like the air we breathe, belongs--or should belong--to everybody."

Critical reception
Cash Box called it "a wry rockin’ romp about the woefully inadequate education most kids receive, [that] doesn’t point the guitar at anyone in particular but considers the possible results of a frustrating situation."

Personnel 
 Don Henley – lead vocals 
 Andrew Gold – keyboards 
 Danny Kortchmar – baritone guitar
 Kenny Edwards – electric guitar 
 Bob Glaub – bass 
 Mark Towner Williams – drums 
 Louise Goffin – harmony vocals
 Maren Jensen – harmony vocals

Chart performance

References

External links 
Heaven Is Under Our Feet, book by Don Henley
"Johnny Can't Read" official music video at Dailymotion.com

1982 songs
Don Henley songs
Songs written by Danny Kortchmar
Songs written by Don Henley
1982 debut singles